Polycesta is a genus of "jewel beetles" in the subfamily Polycestinae, containing the following species:

 Polycesta aequinoxialis Thomson, 1878
 Polycesta aethiops (Voet, 1806)
 Polycesta afghanica Volkovitsh in Alexeev, et al., 1990
 Polycesta alternans Waterhouse, 1904
 Polycesta angulosa Jacqueline du Val, 1857
 Polycesta arizonica Schaeffer, 1906
 Polycesta aruensis Obenberger, 1924
 Polycesta bahamensis Moore & Diéguez, 2008
 Polycesta bicolor Kerremans, 1897
 Polycesta bilyi Cobos, 1990
 Polycesta brunneipennis Fisher, 1949
 Polycesta californica LeConte, 1857
 Polycesta cazieri Barr, 1949
 Polycesta constrictinotum Westcott, 1998
 Polycesta cortezii Thomson, 1878
 Polycesta costata (Solier, 1849)
 Polycesta crypta Barr, 1949
 Polycesta cubae Chevrolat, 1838
 Polycesta cuprofasciata Moore & Diéguez, 2008
 Polycesta cyanea Chamberlin, 1933
 Polycesta cyanipes (Fabricius, 1787)
 Polycesta decorata Moore & Diéguez, 2008
 Polycesta depressa (Linnaeus, 1771)
 Polycesta dominicana Cobos, 1990
 Polycesta elata LeConte, 1858
 Polycesta embriki Obenberger, 1936
 Polycesta excavata Blanchard, 1846
 Polycesta fisheri Obenberger, 1936
 Polycesta flavomaculata Nelson, 1960
 Polycesta fossulata (Péringuey, 1886)
 Polycesta garcetei Moore & Diéguez, 2008
 Polycesta goryi Saunders, 1871
 Polycesta gossei Waterhouse, 1904
 Polycesta guanacastensis Moore & Diéguez, 2008
 Polycesta hageni Barr, 1949
 Polycesta hermani Cobos, 1981
 Polycesta insulana Fisher, 1930
 Polycesta iranica (Obenberger, 1923)
 Polycesta mastersii Macleay, 1872
 Polycesta montezuma Gory & Laporte, 1838
 Polycesta olivieri Waterhouse, 1904
 Polycesta perfecta Kerremans, 1914
 Polycesta peringueyi Kerremans, 1909
 Polycesta perlucida Kerremans, 1897
 Polycesta plana Nelson, 2000
 Polycesta porcata (Fabricius, 1775)
 Polycesta regularis Waterhouse, 1904
 Polycesta strandi Obenberger, 1928
 Polycesta tamarugalis Moore & Diéguez, 2008
 Polycesta thomae Chevrolat, 1838
 Polycesta tonkinea Fairmaire, 1889
 Polycesta tularensis Chamberlin, 1938
 Polycesta variegata Waterhouse, 1904
 Polycesta velasco Gory & Laporte, 1838
 Polycesta viridicostata Neef de Sainval, 1998

References

Buprestidae genera